The United Kingdom DodgeBall Association (UKDBA) is the ex dodgeball association in the UK . It was founded in 2005 by the CEO and Chairman of the organization, Mo Islam. The association is based in Stevenage, United Kingdom. 

It was recognised by Sport England as the national governing body of dodgeball in the UK until 2018.

League Activity

Premier League

The Premier League was established in 2010. The six highest ranked teams in the UK competed over six weeks in the inaugural season. Jammy Dodgers claimed the title seeing off Warwick Warriors, Leicester City Ligers, Balls of Steel, Vipers and Derby Seahawks.

Season 2 saw the league expanded to eight teams and it was Bedford Bulls, one of the promoted sides, who stormed to the title in a dramatic final week.

Derby Seahawks claimed the 2012/13 title winning 11 out of their 14 matches over the five-week season.

The league expanded again for the 2013/14 season, increasing to 10 teams. Going into the final week of the season Dirty Ducks lead Meteors at the top of the table by 1 point.
In the final week The Meteors went on to win the 2013/14 title by the narrowest of margins.
The 2014/15 season was also very close but newly promoted Bedford Mighty Eagles clinched the title with Meteors falling runners up by just two points.

National League

The National League is the second tier of UK dodgeball from which teams are promoted annually to the Premier League.

The first season, 2010/11, saw every team outside the Premier League divided into four regional conferences. Teams were ranked based on tournament performances throughout the season, with the top two teams from each conference qualifying for the play-offs. Bedford Bulls claimed promotion alongside play-off winners Meteors.

The 2011/12 season saw a change in format with the creation of an eight-team Division 1 in a traditional league setup. Division 2 was also set up in this season, running a similar setup to the National League in 2010/11 season, with four conferences divided between university and club teams and regional, North and South. Reepham Raiders claimed the Division 1 title and promotion alongside runners-up Imperial Wolverines. Division 2 play-offs were won by Bullet Dodgers beating fellow promoted side Winchester Bullets in the play-off final.

Fellows Appreciation Society claimed the Division 1 title in 2012/13 season, winning promotion alongside Bullet Dodgers. Balls of Steel reclaimed their Premier League place in a relegation/promotion play-off game against Leicester City Ligers. Fellows Appreciation Society allowed club mates Dirty Ducks to take their place in the Premier League. Division 2 Play-offs were won by Bedford Mighty Eagles, with all teams that made the play-offs getting promoted due to the league restructure.

In the 2013/14 season, the National League was restructured. Division 1 and 2 were split into three regional conferences of five teams, North, South West and South East. In Division 1 the top two from each conference win a place in the promotion play-off for the two Premier League places, the bottom two from each conferences enter the relegation play-offs with the bottom three being relegated into Division 2. In Division 2 the top two from each conference win a place in the promotion play-off for the three Division 1 places, the bottom two from each conferences enter the play-offs to avoid being relegated into non-league.

University League 
As mentioned above, there is a University Premier League and in addition there runs a University League 1, divided into North and South.

Women's Premier League

In 2013 the Women's Premier League was created. The six highest ranked teams in the UK competed over five weeks in the inaugural season. Bedford Mighty Eagles claimed the title with one week remaining, seeing off Leicester City Ligeresses, Southampton Dodgettes, Leeds Dodge Ladies, Derby Seahawks Women and Bedfoedshire Bulls Women.

Leicester League

Leicester League is a county league comprising Bullet Dodgers, Leicester City Ligers, Leicester Minotaurs, Hinckley Dodgeball Club, Hinckley Revolution.

Social & Fun League

The Social & Fun League is run in London by an organization called GoMammoth.

Women's Dodgeball

Like the men, woman also have their own leagues. 12 womens teams have been made in the last 2 years of the association being the governing body in the United Kingdom. It has gone on to become a very popular sport in universities around the United Kingdom.

References

Dodgeball